Matthew "Brian King" is an American screenwriter and director known for writing Haunter, Night Train, and Cypher.  He was nominated in 2014 for Best Screenplay at the Fangoria Chainsaw Awards.

Career
In an interview for King's film Haunter, director Vincenzo Natali discussed how grateful he is to King after working with him on both Haunter and Cypher.  "Out of the blue I came across my friend Brian King’s script for what was then called Company Man. Ultimately it was named Cypher. And then that came together very quickly. It took maybe...I don’t know, it was another 6-8 months and we were shooting the movie. And almost an identical thing happened with Haunter because I had these sort of long-standing, very ambitious projects, High Rise and Neuromancer that I’d been trying to do after Splice. And, invariably, it takes a long time. So, in the interim, Brian came up with this new script, entirely his creation. And I really loved it. We put it together in probably about the same time period, like eight months or less and we were shooting. So Brian keeps saving my ass. That’s how it works."

Filmography

Writer

Director

Awards and nominations

References

External links
 

Living people
Businesspeople from Los Angeles
21st-century American businesspeople
American male screenwriters
Writers from Los Angeles
Year of birth missing (living people)
Place of birth missing (living people)
Film directors from Los Angeles
Screenwriters from California
21st-century American screenwriters
21st-century American male writers